Karlskrona Municipality (Karlskrona kommun) is a municipality in Blekinge County in South Sweden in southern Sweden. It borders to Emmaboda Municipality, Torsås Municipality and Ronneby Municipality. The city of Karlskrona is the seat of the municipality.

Like most Swedish municipalities it was created during the municipal reform in the early seventies, combining several earlier local government units of urban and rural type, among them the City of Karlskrona.

Localities 
There are 18 urban areas (also called a Tätort or locality) in Karlskrona Municipality.

In the table the localities are listed according to the size of the population as of December 31, 2005. The municipal seat is in bold characters.

Parishes 
Parishes ordered by city and hundreds:

Karlskrona
Karlskrona City Parish
Royal Karlskrona Admiralty Parish
Eastern Hundred
Augerum Parish
Flymen Parish
Jämjö Parish
Kristianopel Parish
Lösen Parish
Ramdala Parish
Rödeby Parish
Sturkö Parish
Torhamn Parish
Virserum Parish
Medelstad Hundred
Aspö Parish
Fridlevstad Parish
Hasslö Parish
Nättraby Parish
Sillhövda Parish
Tving Parish
Hästö

International relations

Twin towns - sister cities
Karlskrona is twinned with:

 Ólafsfjörður, Iceland
 Aizpute, Latvia
 Gdynia, Poland
 Hillerød, Denmark
 Horten, Norway
 Klaipėda, Lithuania
 Loviisa, Finland
 Rostock, Germany

Villages

See also 
Blekinge Institute of Technology
Swedish Coast Guard
Swedish National Maritime Museums

References 

Statistics Sweden

External links 

Karlskrona Municipality - Official site
Mitt Karlskrona - Swedish Karlskrona city guide
Coat of arms

 
Municipalities of Blekinge County